Hektor is a Trojan prince in Greek mythology.

Hektor may also refer to:

 624 Hektor, the largest of the Jovian Trojan asteroids
 Hektor (lens), a photographic lens design
 HECToR, Cray supercomputer located in Britain
Hektor Martin, fictional character

See also

 Hector (disambiguation)